Freising is a Landkreis (district) in Bavaria, Germany. Following a recent ranking of the German magazine Focus-Money comparing all German districts it is number one concerning economic growth abilities. It is bounded by (from the north and clockwise) the districts of Kelheim, Landshut, Erding, Munich, Dachau and Pfaffenhofen.
The district is located north of the Munich metropolitan area. The Isar and Amper rivers run in parallel from southwest to northeast. North of the rivers there is the Hallertau, a hilly region mainly used for hop growing.

History
In the Holy Roman Empire, Freising was a clerical state ruled by the bishops. In 1803, when the clerical states of Germany were dissolved, the region was annexed by Bavaria.

Coat of arms
The coat of arms displays:
 the blue and white checked pattern of Bavaria
 the rose from the arms of the medieval county of Moosburg
 The "Freising Moor's head"

The Freising Moor's head
This is a controversial charge in the Coat of Arms, which could represent one of many different persons:

 One of the three Magi (one of them is shown as a moor)
 Saints who were, or probably were, moors
 St. Mauritius
 St. Zeno
 St. Sigismund (mixed up with St. Mauritius)
Or just that a black Moor King.
 St. Corbinian, who was not a moor, but whose pictures might have become darker over time.
 Other person or meaning lost in time

It is important to note the crown on the moor's head, which probably indicated that the territory of the Bishop of Freising was autonomous.

Towns and municipalities

References

External links

Official website (German)
Freising County Flag

 
Districts of Bavaria